The men's heavyweight competition in sumo at the 2001 World Games took place on 25 August 2001 at the Tenno Town Gymnasium in Tenno, Akita, Japan.

Competition format
A total of 14 athletes entered the competition. They fought in stepladder system.

Results

Gold medal bracket

Bronze medal bracket

References

External links
 Results on IWGA website

Sumo at the 2001 World Games